209th Division or 209th Infantry Division may refer to:

 209th Coastal Division (Italy)
 209th Division (1st Formation)(People's Republic of China), 1949
 209th Division (2nd Formation)(People's Republic of China), 1949–1950
 209th Division (Imperial Japanese Army)
 209th Infantry Division (Wehrmacht)
 209th Rifle Division